The 1956 Montana State Bobcats football team was an American football team that represented Montana State University in the Rocky Mountain Conference (RMC) during the 1956 NAIA football season. In its fourth season under head coach Tony Storti, the team compiled a 9–0–1, won the RMC championship, tied with Saint Joseph's (IN) in the Aluminum Bowl, and was recognized as the national champion in NAIA.

The team excelled on both offense and defense. On offense, the 1956 Bobcats averaged 323.1 rushing yards per game, a total that remains a program record. On defense, the team gave up 9.1 points per game, a total that was the lowest in program history until the 1976 team limited opponents to 8.1 points per game.

Storti's assistant coaches were Joe Berry (line), Herb Agocs (ends), and Gene Bourdet (backs).

Don Edwards and Jim Posewitz were co-winners of the team's most valuable player award.

Tackle Ron Warzeka was selected as a second-team player on the Little All-America team. He went on to play for the Oakland Raiders in the American Football League.

Several Bobcats were named to the All-Rocky Mountain Conference football teams selected by the Associated Press (AP) and United Press International (UPI). They are: Warzeka (AP-1; UPI-1); R Ed Ritt (AP-1; UPI-1); fullback Don Edwards (AP-1; UPI-1); center Sonny Holland (AP-1; UPI-1); quarterback Dave Alt (AP-1; UPI-1); end Jim Posewitz (UPI-2); end Bob Black (UPI-HM); guard Herb Roberts (UPI-HM); guard Charley Jackson (UPI-HM); and halfback George Marinkovich (UPI-HM).

Schedule

References

Montana State
Montana State
Montana State Bobcats football seasons
NAIA Football National Champions
Rocky Mountain Athletic Conference football champion seasons
College football undefeated seasons
Montana State Bobcats football